División de Honor de Béisbol 2011 was the 26th season since its establishment. 2011 season lasted from February to July. FC Barcelona claimed their 4th and last title of their history after of being disbanded by FC Barcelona's chairman Sandro Rosell.

Final standings

External links
2011 season at rfebeisbolsofbol.com

División de Honor de Béisbol